The 2002–03 season was the 74th season in the existence of FC Sochaux-Montbéliard and the club's second consecutive season in the top flight of French football. In addition to the domestic league, Sochaux participated in this season's editions of the Coupe de France, Coupe de la Ligue, and UEFA Intertoto Cup. The season covered the period from 1 July 2002 to 30 June 2003.

First-team squad
Squad at end of season

Transfers

In

Out

Competitions

Overview

Ligue 1

League table

Results summary

Results by round

Matches

Coupe de France

Coupe de la Ligue

UEFA Intertoto Cup

Second round

Third round

Semi-finals

Statistics

Goalscorers

References

FC Sochaux-Montbéliard seasons
Sochaux